Sheherezade Alam (1947/1948 – 19 May 2022) was a Pakistani ceramist.

Education and family
Alam was born in Pakistan to Mahmoud Alam, a Pakistani former tennis player and his wife, Surayya, in Lahore. She had two brothers, Asad and Shaban. Brought up in Lahore, she completed her FA from its Kinnaird College. She went on to obtain her Bachelor of Fine Arts (BFA) in Design with a distinction in ceramics from Lahore's National College of Arts (NCA), where she studied under the country's first ceramist, Salahuddin Mian. She later became an artist-in-residence at Yale University. She taught at the NCA, as well as at Bilkent University (Ankara, Turkey).

Personal life
In 1971, she married Zahoor ul Akhlaq (1941–1999), a painter, and the couple had two daughters, Jahanara (1974–1999) and Nurjahan (b. 1979). Zahoor and Jahanara were murdered in their home in Lahore in 1999 by a visiting acquaintance, Shahzad Butt, a roti merchant of the city. The killer could give no reason for having turned his gun on them.

Career

Shows

Group
 1980: Sultan Art Gallery, Kuwait
 1983: Group Show, British Council, Islamabad
 1983: Group Show, Rohtas Gallery, Islamabad
 1988: Joint exhibition, Yale University, New Haven, USA
 1995 to 1999: Toronto Outdoor Art Exhibition (yearly)
 2009: Group Show, Vogue Art Gallery, Islamabad.

Solo
 1990: Chawkandi Arts, Karachi
 1993: Ish Gallery, Ankara, Turkey
 1994: Bismillah, Arcadia Art Gallery, Toronto, Ontario, Canada
 1996: Clay Continuum, Gardiner Art Museum of Ceramic Art, Toronto, Ontario, Canada
 2004: Offering Bowls, Arcadia Art Gallery, Toronto, Ontario, Canada
 2005: Laali, Ceramic Installation, Private Residence, Lahore
 2006: Laali, The garden of Imran Mir, Karachi

References

1940s births
2022 deaths
Date of birth unknown
Pakistani ceramists
Pakistani potters
Kinnaird College for Women University alumni
National College of Arts alumni
Artists from Lahore
Women potters
Pakistani women ceramists
20th-century ceramists
20th-century Pakistani artists
21st-century ceramists
21st-century Pakistani artists